Habibah binti Abdul Rahim (born  1961) is a Malaysian educator and the former Director-General of Education from January 2020 to March 2021 (but took compulsory retirement as she turned 60 years of age in April the same year).

Education 
Habibah graduated with a Bachelor of Philosophy with Honors in Biology from the University of Salford in 1985. She then went on to study for a Master's degree in Education at the University of Bristol in 1993. Habibah earned a Doctor of Philosophy degree in Education from Stanford University in 2001.

Honours

Honours of Malaysia 
  :
  Commander of the Order of Meritorious Service (PJN) - Datuk (2020)
  :
  Knight Grand Companion of the Order of Sultan Sharafuddin Idris Shah (SSIS) - Datin Paduka Setia (2020)

References 

1961 births
Living people
Malaysian Muslims
Malaysian people of Malay descent
Malaysian women academics
Malaysian educators
Stanford University alumni
Commanders of the Order of Meritorious Service